Cape Royds is a dark rock cape forming the western extremity of Ross Island, facing on McMurdo Sound, Antarctica.  It was discovered by the Discovery Expedition (1901–1904) and named for Lieutenant Charles Royds, Royal Navy, who acted as meteorologist on the expedition. Royds subsequently rose to become an Admiral and was later Commissioner of the Metropolitan Police, London.  There is a hut at Cape Royds built and used by Ernest Shackleton and his team during their 1907–1909 expedition.

Shackleton's Hut

When Shackleton went into McMurdo Sound in 1908, having failed to land on King Edward VII Land, he decided to build a hut at Cape Royds, a small promontory twenty-three miles north of Hut Point where Scott had stayed during the Discovery Expedition. The whole shore party lived in this hut through the winter of 1908. When spring came stores were sledged to Hut Point, so that should the sea-ice break up early between these two places they might not be left in an awkward position. Shackleton did not return to the hut after his farthest south attempt, however he had left full instructions with Professor Edgeworth David as to the care of the hut, and before the whole Expedition left, the hut was put in order. A letter was pinned in a conspicuous place inside, stating that there were sufficient provisions and equipment to last fifteen men for one year, indicating also the details of these provisions and the position of the coal store. The stove was in good condition, and the letter ended with an invitation for any succeeding party to make what use they required of stores and hut. The hut was then locked and the key nailed on the door in a conspicuous place.

Scott could have used this as a base during the Terra Nova Expedition, given that it was unlikely to suffer the sea ice problem that afflicted Hut Point, but he had reached an agreement with Shackleton that neither would use each other's facilities. The only visit to Shackleton's hut made during Scott's 1910–1913 expedition was by a former member of Shackleton's expedition. Shackleton's hut was found intact, with bread still on the tables just as it had been left. Raymond Priestley, who had walked out the door of the building two years previously, described coming back to the place as 'very eerie'. Priestley retrieved a tin of butter, tins of jam, a plum pudding and gingerbread biscuits from the site, all of which were described as being perfectly fresh.

Amongst other things, five crates of McKinlay and Co. whisky were found buried under the hut in 2006. One crate is currently in Canterbury Museum in Christchurch, New Zealand undergoing restoration and, if possible, analysis of the whisky.

Historic site
The Antarctic Heritage Trust (New Zealand) has custody over the site. Nominated by AHT, Shackleton's Hut was listed in the 2004, 2006, and 2008 World Monuments Watch by the World Monuments Fund to attract attention and financial support for the site. In 2004, through WMF, funding for conservation was provided by American Express, and by 2008 the structure was fully restored to its condition when Shackleton's team left it. Shackleton's Hut has been designated a Historic Site or Monument (HSM 15), following a proposal by New Zealand and the United Kingdom to the Antarctic Treaty Consultative Meeting.

Geographical features 
Some features on the cape have been charted and individually named by the British Antarctic Expedition, 1907–09, under Ernest Shackleton.

Flagstaff Point is the cape's southernmost point. Shackleton's expedition established its winter headquarters and erected a flag near the point. The dark volcanic sand beach 0.5 nautical miles (1 km) southward of Flagstaff Point is named Blacksand Beach. Shackleton's expedition found the beach within safe walking distance of their base hut near Flagstaff Point and gave it its descriptive name.

Antarctic Specially Protected Area
An area of 6200 ha at the cape is protected as Antarctic Specially Protected Area (ASPA 121, incorporating HSM 15) because it supports the southernmost established Adélie penguin colony known, with a long period of population data. The presence of polynyas in McMurdo Sound provides an ice-free area where penguins can feed, and is important for the survival of the penguin colony.

The area is also important for its terrestrial and freshwater ecology; it is the type locality for several species of algae, including the southernmost record of snow algae.

See also
 List of Antarctic Field Camps

References

Royds
Heroic Age of Antarctic Exploration
Antarctic Specially Protected Areas
Penguin colonies
Historic Sites and Monuments of Antarctica
Former populated places in Antarctica
Outposts of Antarctica
History of the Ross Dependency